Mansi may refer to:

People
 Mansi people, an indigenous people living in Tyumen Oblast, Russia
 Mansi language
 Giovanni Domenico Mansi (1692–1769), Italian theologian, scholar, historian and archbishop
 Kate Mansi, American actress born in 1987

Places
 Mansi, Myanmar, a town in the Kachin State of Myanmar (Burma)
 Mansi, Banmauk, a village in Myanmar (Burma)

See also
Minsi (disambiguation)

Language and nationality disambiguation pages